Distro may refer to:

 Linux distribution, a specific vendor's operating system-package composed of the Linux kernel, GNU tools and libraries, additional software based on a package management system.
 Software distro, a set of software components (i.e. open source components) assembled into a working whole and distributed to a user community.
 A zine distribution service